Claudia Montero (25 June 1962 – 16 January 2021) was an Argentinian composer resident in Spain.

Biography
Montero studied music at the Alberto Ginastera Conservatory in Buenos Aires.  Following her relocation to Valencia, she studied at the University of Valencia.

Montero won four Latin Grammy Awards over the years 2014, 2016, and 2018, and the award for best classical album in 2018. She was composer in residence with the Palau de Musica and the Valencia symphony Orchestra in Spain.  The world première of Montero's piano concerto, Concierto en Blanco y Negro, was held in 2017 at the Galway International Arts Festival, with Clare Hammond as soloist.

Montero died of cancer on 16 January 2021, aged 58.

References

External links

1962 births
2021 deaths
Argentine classical composers
Latin Grammy Award winners
Date of birth missing
Place of birth missing
Place of death missing
Women classical composers
20th-century Argentine musicians
20th-century classical composers
20th-century women composers
21st-century Argentine musicians
21st-century classical composers
21st-century women composers
Women in Latin music
Musicians from Buenos Aires
Argentine women composers